Pilar, del Pilar, or Pilař is a surname.

In Spanish culture, this surname is derived from  "Maria del Pilar", a reference to Mary, mother of Jesus.

In Czech (pilař), and Serbo-Croatian (pìlār, pilar) the surname literally means the occupation of sawyer. The Czech-language feminine form is Pilarová or Pilařová.

Notable people with this surname include:

 Đuro Pilar (1846–1893), Croatian geologist, professor and rector at the University of Zagreb
 Eva Pilarová (1939–2020), Czech jazz and pop music singer, actress and photographer
 Fernando Pilar (born 1979), Brazilian football player
 Gladys del Pilar (born 1967), Swedish singer and dancer
 Gregorio del Pilar (1875–1899), one of the youngest generals in the Philippine Revolutionary Forces during the Philippine Revolution
 Ivo Pilar (1874–1933), Croatian historian, politician and jurist, considered the father of Croatian geopolitics
 Karel Pilař (born 1977), Czech professional ice hockey player
 Karolína Pilařová, female Czech curler 
 Marcelo H. del Pilar (1850–1896), Filipino writer, journalist, satirist and revolutionary leader of the Philippine Revolution
 María del Pilar Pereyra (born 1978), Argentine butterfly swimmer
 Pío del Pilar (1860–1931), revolutionary general of the Philippines
 Radek Pilař (1931–1993), Czech artist and cartoonist
 Roman Pilar (1894–1937), Soviet security and intelligence officer
 Václav Pilař (born 1988), Czech football player
 América del Pilar Rodrigo (20th century), Argentinian botanist

See also
 Pilarz (surname)
 

Czech-language surnames 
Portuguese-language surnames
Spanish-language surnames
Occupational surnames